Saen Saep is a khwaeng (subdistrict) of Min Buri District, in Bangkok, Thailand. In 2020, it had a total population of 45,185 people.

References

Subdistricts of Bangkok
Min Buri district